Phrynomedusa appendiculata, the Santa Catarina leaf frog, is a species of frog in the subfamily Phyllomedusinae.
It is endemic to Brazil, where it is only known from the southern Atlantic Forest. Its natural habitats are subtropical or tropical moist lowland forests and rivers.

Despite being classified as Near Threatened on the IUCN Red List, it is thought to be a very rare and declining species, and thus a more threatened conservation status is likely warranted. After 1970, no other sightings of the species were made until late 2011, when it was rediscovered near Santo André in the state of São Paulo, marking the first observation of the species in over 41 years; these results were published in a 2022 study. The factors for its initial disappearance remain unclear, although it may have to do with chytridiomycosis and habitat loss. 

The Santo André site is over 250 kilometers away from its type locality near São Bento do Sul in Santa Catarina, and despite immense growth in citizen science efforts over the following decade, the species has not been recorded at any other sites aside from Santo André. This may be due to the Santo André site having a more pristine habitat optimal for P. appendiculata, but it may also be due to P. appendiculata being more difficult to record and thus being overlooked at other sites.

Sources

Phrynomedusa
Endemic fauna of Brazil
Amphibians described in 1925
Taxonomy articles created by Polbot